Dost is a 2004 Indian Telugu language film produced by N. Radhakrishna Reddy under banner N.R.K. Cinemas, directed by Muppalaneni Siva. Siva Balaji, Neha and newcomers Karthik and Preethi Mehra starred with support from K. Viswanath, Suhasini, Brahmanandam, M. S. Narayana, Tanikella Bharani, Venu Madhav, Ali, Hema, Shankar Melkote, Raghu Babu, Mohana, Srikar Babu and Karthik. The music was composed by Koti. The film was a remake of Malayalam film Nammal.

Plot
Snehalatha (Suhasini) takes charge as the Principal in a college where Shyam (Karthik) and Sivan (Siva Balaji) are the heroes. Shyam and Sivan are fun-filled, naughty characters. Meghamala (Neha Bamb) is teased and ragged by the duo, who happens to be the daughter of Principal's friend. Megha complains and Snehalatha takes action against Shyam and Shivan. She discovers to her surprise that Shyam and Shivan are orphans, hardworking and their guardian is a teacher (K.Viswanath). But the real twist happens when Snehalatha finds out that one of them is her son.

Cast

Siva Balaji as Siva
 Karthik as Shyam
Neha Bamb as Megha
 Preethi mehra as Malli
K. Viswanath as Sathyamoorthy
Suhasini as Snehalatha
Ali
Ammalu
Apoorva
Brahmanandam as A.V.Rao
Hema
Kallu Chidambaram
Kranthi
Chittajalu Lakshmipati as attender Lakshmipati
M. S. Narayana
Mohana
Raghu Babu
Raghunath Reddy
Ananth Babu
Sarika Ramachandra Rao
Shankar Melkote
Shravan Kumar
Sreekarababu as Vicky
Swathi
Tanikella Bharani
Venu Madhav as Balu
Master Banti

Soundtrack

References

External links

2004 films
2000s Telugu-language films
Telugu remakes of Malayalam films
Films scored by Koti
Films directed by Muppalaneni Shiva